Regional Information Sharing Systems (RISS) is an information-sharing program funded by the U.S. Federal government whose purpose is to connect databases from local and regional law enforcement so that they can use each other's data for criminal investigations.

In 1997, RISS created RISSNET, a network to interconnect many local, state, regional, and tribal law enforcement databases.

In 2002, RISSNET was connected with the FBI's Law Enforcement Online system.

In 2003, the National Criminal Intelligence Sharing Plan (NCISP) declared that RISSNET would be the official "backbone" for all unclassified, but sensitive criminal intelligence data traffic. Later that year, members were also given access to the Automated Trusted Information Exchange (ATIX) database, which contains information on homeland security and terrorist threats.

See also
 Automated Trusted Information Exchange
 Joint Regional Information Exchange System
 Multistate Anti-Terrorism Information Exchange

References

External links
 

Surveillance